Ronald Ray Goodwin (January 9, 1941 – December 12, 2013) was an American football wide receiver in the National Football League who played for the Philadelphia Eagles. He played college football for the Baylor Bears.

References

1941 births
2013 deaths
American football wide receivers
Philadelphia Eagles players
Baylor Bears football players
People from Hutchinson County, Texas